Ride on Time is the sixth single by Japanese singer-songwriter Tatsuro Yamashita, released in May 1980. This was his first single to enter the Oricon Singles Chart, peaking in at number three. Some sources claim that this was the beginning of the genre called "City pop".

Overview
Ride on Time is the lead single from the album of the same name, but the song was re-recorded in the album issue just four months later. This version would be included in his Greatest hits album "Greatest Hits! of Tatsuro Yamashita" in 1982 and "Opus (All Time Best 1975-2012)" in 2012. The live version was also included in his live album "Joy" in 1989.

This song was written for a Maxell cassette tape commercial. Yamashita himself had appeared in the commercial. The footage, shot in Saipan, shows him immersing himself in the sea near his knees with his back on the horizon, aiming a finger gun at the camera. One of the photographs would later be used as the cover for his single. At the end of the commercial, the caption "いい音しか残れない" can be seen which directly translates to English as "Only good sounds remain". The same caption can also be seen on his studio album "Ride on Time" and its Obi strip. The B-side track "Rainy Walk" was originally from his studio album Moonglow and has the same contents as the album.

Track listing

Personnel

Ride on Time
Tatsuro Yamashita – Electric Guitar (Right), Kalimba, Percussion & Background Vocals
Jun Aoyama – Drums
Koki Ito – Bass
Kazuo Shiina – Electric Guitar (Left)
Hiroyuki Namba – Keyboards
Hidefumi Toki – Alto Sax Solo
Minako Yoshida – Background Vocals
Shin Kazuhara – Trumpet
Yoshikazu Kishi – Trumpet
Shigeharu Mukai – Trombone
Tadanori Konakawa – Trombone
Takeru Muraoka – Tenor Sax
Shunzo Sunahara – Baritone Sax

Rainy Walk
(from the studio album Moonglow)
Tatsuro Yamashita – Percussion & Background Vocals
Yukihiro Takahashi – Drums
Haruomi Hosono – Bass
Masaki Matsubara – Electric Guitar
Hiroshi Sato – Electric Piano
Masahito "Pecker" Hashida – Percussion
Shin Kazuhara – Trumpet
Yoshikazu Kishi – Trumpet
Shigeharu Mukai – Trombone
Tadanori Konakawa – Trombone
Kazuo Suzuki – Tenor Sax
Shunzo Sunahara – Baritone Sax
Tadaaki Ohno – Strings Concert Master

BVCR-19604

Overview
In 2003, the song was used as the ending theme for the TBS drama Good Luck!!. Yamashita replied, It was just a sunny day. But I'm just happy that the song came back to life. This feeling cannot be expressed by my mouth. Especially because it is "Ride on Time".

A month later, the song would get a remastered reissue. The coupling song was changed from Rainy Walk to Amaku Kiken na Kaori which was previously released as a single and was used as the theme song for the Japanese drama series of the same name. The single would peak at number thirteen on the Oricon Weekly Singles Chart. The fifth track of the CD release is a 30 second a cappella version that was previously used in a Maxell commercial in 1980. It features Yamashita in Mt. Tokachi, Hokkaido.

Track listing

Personnel

Ride on Time
Tatsuro Yamashita – Electric Guitar (Right), Kalimba, Percussion & Background Vocals
Jun Aoyama – Drums
Koki Ito – Bass
Kazuo Shiina – Electric Guitar (Left)
Hiroyuki Namba – Keyboards
Hidefumi Toki – Alto Sax Solo
Minako Yoshida – Background Vocals
Shin Kazuhara – Trumpet
Yoshikazu Kishi – Trumpet
Shigeharu Mukai – Trombone
Tadanori Konakawa – Trombone
Takeru Muraoka – Tenor Sax
Shunzo Sunahara – Baritone Sax

あまく危険な香り [Amaku Kiken na Kaori, Sweet & Dangerous Scent]
(from the 1982 single of the same name)
Tatsuro Yamashita – Electric Guitar (Left), Acoustic Piano (Solo) & Percussion
Jun Aoyama – Drums
Koki Ito – Bass
Tsunehide Matsuki – Electric Guitar (Right)
Hiroyuki Namba – Keyboards
Motoya Hamaguchi – Percussion
Shin Kazuhara – Trumpet
Masahiro Kobayashi – Trumpet
Shigeharu Mukai – Trombone
Tadanori Konakawa – Trombone
Takeru Muraoka – Tenor Sax
Shunzo Sunahara – Baritone Sax
Tadaaki Ohno – Strings Concert Master
Koji Hajima – Conductor
Strings arranged by Masahide Sakuma

Chart positions

Weekly charts

Year-end charts

Release history

References

Tatsuro Yamashita albums
1980 songs
Japanese pop songs
Japanese rock songs